The Center for Jewish Art (CJA) is a research institute at the Hebrew University of Jerusalem, devoted to the documentation and research of Jewish visual culture. Established in 1979, it documented and researched objects of Jewish art in ca. 800 museums, libraries, private collections and synagogues in about 50 countries. Today, the Center's archives and collections constitute the largest and most comprehensive body of information on Jewish art and material culture in existence. The CJA's research and documentation is included in the Bezalel Narkiss Index of Jewish Art.

History
The Center for Jewish Art at the Hebrew University of Jerusalem was established in 1979 by Professor Bezalel Narkiss, Israel Prize laureate, with an aim to document objects of Jewish art and produce a comprehensive iconographical index of Jewish subjects. The center was an outcome of Narkiss's iconographical research of medieval Hebrew illuminated manuscripts, which he initiated with Professor Gabrielle Sed-Rajna in 1974. The Index initially consisted of four sections: a Section of Hebrew Illuminated Manuscripts, of Sacred and Ritual Objects, of Ancient Jewish Art, and of Modern Jewish Art.

Professor Bezalel Narkiss headed the CJA until 1991. The next director, Professor Aliza Cohen-Mushlin, established a fifth section for Jewish Ritual Architecture and Funerary Art. Under her leadership the CJA undertook many research expeditions to post-Communist Central and Eastern Europe, in order to measure endangered synagogues and tombstones in regions, which were previously inaccessible to western scholars. In addition, from 1994 CJA documented those synagogues in Germany which survived the Nazi regime and were not demolished in Kristallnacht. The documentation projects in Germany were done in cooperation with the Department of Architectural History at the Technical University in Braunschweig, headed by Professor Harmen H. Thies. In 1997 this cooperation was institutionalized as Bet Tfila Research Unit for Jewish Architecture in Europe.
The Section for Printed Books in Hebrew Typeset was founded in 2018.

Publications
 Jewish Art (in 1974–1985, Journal of Jewish Art) is an annual devoted to the research of Jewish art. Its editors were Bezalel Narkiss and Aliza Cohen-Mushlin; Professors Ziva Amishai-Maisels and Bianca Kühnel served as guest editors of two issues.
 Rimonim (רימונים) is a Hebrew journal on Jewish art, aiming at bringing the results of academic research to a wider Israeli audience.
 In 1976-1994 the Center for Jewish Art published ten volumes of Jerusalem Index of Jewish Art as collections of card on Hebrew illuminated manuscripts, ritual objects and ancient Jewish art.
 From 2007, Beit Tfila publishes a series of monographs on Jewish architecture and a series of smaller studies on individual Jewish buildings. The editors of both series are Aliza Cohen-Mushlin and Harmen Thies, and they are published by the Imhoff Verlag in English and German.

The Bezalel Narkiss Index of Jewish Art
The Bezalel Narkiss Index of Jewish Art is the main project of the Center for Jewish Art at the Hebrew University of Jerusalem. The Index is the world’s largest repository of documentation of Jewish material culture which constantly continues to grow. Currently, the Index includes more than 400,000 images from ca. 800 museums, libraries, private collections and synagogues all over the world, as well as architectural plans of ca. 1,700 synagogues documented in situ. The images are classified according to their iconographical subject, type of objects, origin, date, style, community, etc. The Index currently contains six thematic divisions: Historic Synagogues of Europe, Catalogue of Wall Paintings in Central and East European Synagogues (by Boris Khaimovich), Catalogue of Illuminated Esther Scrolls (by Dagmara Budzioch), Slovenian Jewish Heritage, Gross Family Collection, and Kurt and Ursula Schubert Archive of Hebrew Illuminated Manuscripts. 
<p> The initial digitization of the Index is being undertaken in cooperation with the National Library of Israel and the Judaica Division of Harvard University Library.

Documentation expeditions 
1.	Albania: ancient synagogues (2003).
2.	Austria: medieval synagogues and manuscripts (1994, 1998-2005).
3.	Azerbaijan: ritual objects and synagogues (1994, 1997).
4.	Belarus: synagogues, cemeteries (1993-2003, 2007).
5.	Bosnia and Herzegovina: synagogues (1998-2004). 
6.	Bulgaria: ritual objects and synagogues (1998).
7.	Canada: synagogues (1998, 1999).
8.	Croatia: synagogues, cemeteries, ritual objects (1986, 1987, 1998, 2000-2007, 2021). 
9.	Czech Republic: ritual objects and synagogues (1994, 1995, 2014).
10.	Dagestan: ritual objects and synagogues (1994).
11.	Denmark: manuscripts (1979-1989).
12.	Egypt: ritual objects and synagogues (1983, 1984).
13.	France: manuscripts (1972-1989, 1999, 2002).
14.	Georgia: ritual objects and synagogues (1997, 1999).
15.	Germany: synagogues and manuscripts (1985, 1994–2010, 2008-2014).
16.	Greece: ritual objects and synagogues (1996, 1997, 1999, 2001-2003). 
17.	Hungary: ritual objects (1986, 1988, 1990), synagogues (2018-19). 
18.	India: ritual objects and synagogues (1995).
19.	Ireland: manuscripts (1975-1980). 
20.	Israel: archaeology, modern art, ritual objects and synagogues (1979-2011). 
21.	Italy: ritual objects and synagogues (1983, 1985, 1990, 1991, 1995, 2000, 2002, 2008, 2009, 2012). 
22.	Latvia: synagogues (2000, 2007-2009).
23.	Lithuania: ritual objects and synagogues (1993, 2000, 2004, 2006-2009).
24.	Macedonia: ancient and modern synagogues (2003).
25.	Moldova: synagogues, cemeteries (1994).
26.	Montenegro: ancient synagogues and Jewish monuments (2004).
27.	Morocco: ritual objects and synagogues (1992, 1993).
28.	Poland: ritual objects (1991-1995, 1997). 
29.	Romania: ritual objects, cemeteries and synagogues (1993, 1996, 1997, 2009, 2010, 2011, 2012, 2017, January 2019, September 2019, May 2022). 
30.	Russia: manuscripts, cemeteries (1989-1994); synagogues, cemeteries and ritual objects in Siberia (2015);  synagogues, cemeteries and ritual objects along the Volga River (2021).
31.	Serbia: ritual objects and synagogues (1986, 1987, 2001, 2002, 2004).
32.	Slovakia: synagogues (2001).
33.	Slovenia: synagogues (2000), Jewish sites, objects, and manuscripts (2018). 
34.	Spain: manuscripts (1987).
35.	Tunisia: ritual objects and synagogues (1997).
36.	Turkey: ritual objects and synagogues (1992-1994, 2017).
37.	Ukraine: synagogues, cemeteries (1991-2003, 2007, 2010-2013).
38.	United Kingdom: manuscripts (1962-1997).
39.	United States: manuscripts (1988-1992, 1998)
40.	Uzbekistan: ritual objects and synagogues (1992, 2000, 2002-2012).
41.	Vatican: survey of manuscripts (1985).

References

External links
 CJA official website
 The Bezalel Narkiss Index of Jewish Art
 The Center for Jewish Art collection at the National Library of Israel website
 Bet Tfila Research Unit website

Hebrew University of Jerusalem
Research institutes in Israel
Mount Scopus
Cultural studies organizations
Jewish museums
Jewish history organizations
Jewish art
Jewish ceremonial art
Jewish ritual objects
Israeli art
Art museums and galleries in Israel